Charles Mayer may refer to:

Charles Mayer (actor) (born 1970), English stage actor
Charles Mayer (boxer) (1882–1972), American boxer
Charles Mayer (composer) (1799–1862), or Meyer, Prussian composer
Charles Mayer (animal collector) (1862–1927), American animal collector and plagiarist 
Charles Mayer (journalist) (1901–1971), Canadian journalist, sportsperson and politician
Charles Mayer (politician) (born 1936), Canadian businessman and politician
Charles F. Mayer (1795–1864), American lawyer, Maryland state senator, and railroad director
Charles F. Mayer (railroad president) (1826–1904), Maryland businessman and B&O president, nephew of the above
Charles Léopold Mayer (1881–1971), French biochemist and philosopher

See also
Charles Maier (disambiguation)
Charles Meyer (disambiguation)